Set Svanholm (2 September 1904 – 4 October 1964) was a Swedish operatic tenor, considered the leading Tristan and Siegfried of the first decade following World War II.

Life and career
Svanholm began his musical career at the age of 17 as a precentor, elementary school teacher, and organist. He then studied at the Royal University College of Music in Stockholm as well as taking singing lessons from the famous baritone John Forsell, who also taught Aksel Schiøtz and Jussi Björling.

He made his operatic debut as a baritone (Stockholm, 1930), singing the role of Silvio in Pagliacci. He sang as a baritone for several years. Then in 1936, after further study, he debuted as a tenor, singing the role of Radamès in Aida. His first Wagnerian tenor roles (Lohengrin and Siegfried) followed in 1937, along with Lemminkäinen in the premiere of Lars-Erik Larsson's The Princess of Cyprus the same year.

Svanholm sang regularly at the New York Metropolitan Opera (1946-1956), the Vienna State Opera (1949-1954), and The Royal Opera House in London (1948–57). He became the director of the Royal Swedish Opera in 1956, a post he held until 1963.

Recordings 
Set Svanholm sings Wagner - Arias and scenes from Lohengrin, Tannhäuser, Die Meistersinger von Nürnberg, Die Walküre and Tristan und Isolde (Set Svanholm, tenor, RCA Orch; Frieder Weissmann, cond. & Philharmonia Orch; Karl Böhm, cond.) Preiser Records 89535
Wagner: Das Rheingold, the famous Solti recording with George London.  Svanholm plays Loge.
Wagner: Die Walküre - Highlights (Set Svanholm, Birgit Nilsson, Josef Greindl.) Preiser Records 93447
Wagner: Die Walküre - Act 1 (Set Svanholm, Kirsten Flagstad, Arnold van Mill; Hans Knappertsbusch, 1957.) Published by Decca
Wagner: Die Walküre - Act I (Set Svanholm, Birgit Nilsson, Josef Greindl; Hans Schmidt-Isserstedt cond.) Bella Voce 107.010
Wagner: Siegfried - (Set Svanholm, Kirsten Flagstad, Josef Hermann, Ludwig Weber; Wilhelm Furtwängler cond.) various releases
Set Svanholm Live - Excerpts from Die Meistersinger von Nürnberg (recorded live at the Royal Theater, Stockholm, 1939; Nils Grevillius cond.), Aida (recorded live at the Royal Theater, Stockholm, 1939; Leo Blech cond.), and Götterdämmerung (recorded live at the Bayreuth Festspielhaus, 1942; Karl Elmendorff cond.) Preiser Records 90332
Mahler: Das Lied von der Erde (Set Svanholm, Elena Nikolaidi, New York Philharmonic Orchestra; Bruno Walter cond.) Music & Arts Programs Of America 950
Saint-Saëns: Samson et Dalila (Set Svanholm, Blanche Thebom, Sigurd Björling, Royal Swedish Opera Orchestra and Chorus, Herbert Sandberg cond.), 1956; Caprice; CAT: CAP 22054

References
Notes

Bibliography
Benson, Robert E., Review: Set Svanholm sings Wagner, Classical CD Review. Accessed 6 February 2009.
Metropolitan Opera Archives, Svanholm, Set (Tenor). Accessed 6 February 2009.
Rosenthal, H. and Warrack, J., "Svanholm, Set" in The Concise Oxford Dictionary of Opera, 2nd Edition, Oxford University Press, 1979.
Svanholm Singers, Set Svanholm. Accessed 6 February 2009.

External links
 History of the Tenor / Set Svanholm / Sound Clips and Narration

1904 births
1964 deaths
People from Västerås
Heldentenors
Swedish operatic tenors
20th-century Swedish male  opera singers
Royal College of Music, Stockholm alumni